Nelson Adolph Pott (July 16, 1899 – December 3, 1963) was a Major League Baseball pitcher who played for one season. He pitched in two games for the Cleveland Indians during the 1922 Cleveland Indians season.

External links

1899 births
1963 deaths
Major League Baseball pitchers
Cleveland Indians players
Baseball players from Ohio